Radio Boogie is a second album by the progressive bluegrass band Hot Rize.

Track listing

 Radio Boogie (Mayo, Smith) 2:44
 Ain't Gonna Work Tomorrow (trad.) 2:24
 Wild Bill Jones (trad.) 2:12
 Land of Enchantment (O'Brien) 3:19
 The Man in the Middle (Campbell) 2:58
I Long for the Hills (O'Brien) 2:27
 Just Ain't (Willis) 2:13
 No Brakes (Wernick) 2:17
 Walkin' the Dog (Grimsley, Thomas) 2:40
 The Sweetest Song I Sing (O'Brien) 3:31
 Tom and Jerry (trad.) 2:22
 Gone But Not Forgotten (Knobloch, Miller, Wernick) 2:51

Personnel
 Nick Forster - bass, vocals
 Tim O'Brien - vocals, mandolin, violin
 Pete Wernick - banjo, vocals
 Charles Sawtelle - guitar, vocals

References

External links
Official site

1981 albums
Hot Rize albums